Daucus abyssinicus may refer to two different taxa of plants:
 Daucus abyssinicus C.A.Mey., a synonym for Daucus carota subsp. abyssinicus A.Braun 
 Daucus abyssinicus Hochst. ex A.Rich., a synonym for Daucus hochstetteri A.Braun ex Engl.